The Rose is a persona used by four fictional characters that appear in comic books published by Marvel Comics. The original Rose first appeared in The Amazing Spider-Man #253 (June 1984), and was created by writer Tom DeFalco.

Publication history
Tom DeFalco recounted: 

DeFalco was fired from The Amazing Spider-Man by editor Jim Owsley before he could reveal the Rose's identity. A subsequent issue of Web of Spider-Man, written by Owsley, revealed the Rose to be Richard Fisk.

Fictional character biography
The character of Rose is depicted as a well-dressed, calm, calculating and gentleman-like crime lord who favors roses and wears a leather, lilac-colored mask.

Richard Fisk

The first Rose was Richard Fisk, the son of Wilson Fisk, who sought to overthrow his father after learning he was the Kingpin of Crime. He later became a Punisher-like vigilante, calling himself Blood Rose. He was eventually shot dead by his own mother, Vanessa. But is later brought back by his father using the tablet of life.

Sergeant Blume
The second Rose was Sergeant Blume (first name unrevealed), a police officer seeking revenge on the Kingpin for the death of his brother, another policeman. While Blume allied himself with Richard in hopes of doing good by breaking the Kingpin's hold on the city, he ended up implicated in several crimes while in the Kingpin's service. He ultimately was shot and killed in a confrontation with Richard's men in the Catskills after he had kidnapped Peter Parker (Spider-Man)'s Aunt May and wife Mary Jane Watson, mistakenly thinking that Peter had discovered information that would blow the lid off of the Kingpin's organization, thus revealing Blume as a double agent.

Jacob Conover
The third Rose was Jacob Conover, a reporter at the Daily Bugle, who took up the identity as payment for saving the life of crime lord Don Fortunato many years earlier. This Rose was loyal solely to Fortunato, as at the time the Kingpin had not returned to power, and his principal enforcer was the cyborg powerhouse known as Delilah. Conover faced a repeated threat to his territory from the Argentinian crime lord known as the Black Tarantula, eventually being present without his Rose disguise when the Tarantula launched a direct assault on Fortunato's home. Preparing to gun down the Tarantula and a roomful of witnesses, Conover was stopped by Spider-Man and carted off to jail.

Phillip Hayes
The fourth Rose was Dr. Phillip Hayes. He took up the Rose persona after he lost his funding in gene-therapy research after an accident in the Phelcorps laboratory, a result of which was the new heroine Jackpot. He deals in "Ebony" shipments, a synthesized drug created from Corruptor's sweat glands. He managed to slip under the superhero radar for a while, but Jackpot was getting closer to discovering his involvement. After he discovered the secret identity of his opponent (through a coincidence resulting from being Sara Ehret's co-worker), he hires Boomerang to track Sara down at her house and murders her husband in front of her and her daughter. He is later arrested and unmasked, much to Sara's shock.

Powers and abilities
The Roses have no superhuman powers. Richard Fisk is trained in the use of guns and has some martial-arts training; Sergeant Blume is a trained police officer; and Jacob Conover is trained in the use of firearms and has a number of criminal contacts.

The Roses always carries a handgun and often carries a variety of mini grenades.

Reception
 In 2022, Screen Rant included The Rose in their "10 Spider-Man Villains That Are Smarter Than They Seem" list.

Other versions
In Marvel Adventures continuity, the Rose is a criminal with enough financial resources to bid a fortune on highly sophisticated battlesuits.

In Ultimate Marvel a maskless Mr. Rose is Kingpin's associate. He was present in the Ultimate Knights storyline where he auditioned "Ronin" to be a part of Fisk's organization and was ordered by Kingpin to blow up Midtown High, but was arrested by the cops.

References 

Articles about multiple fictional characters
Characters created by Tom DeFalco
Comics characters introduced in 1976
Comics characters introduced in 1984
Comics characters introduced in 1991
Comics characters introduced in 2010
Fictional crime bosses
Fictional henchmen
Fictional reporters
Fictional medical specialists
Marvel Comics male supervillains
Marvel Comics police officers